Anandan or Agni Purana Mahimai is an Indian Tamil language historical film directed and produced by S. D. S. Yogi with M. V. Mani, S. D. R. Chandran, B. Saraswathi, Krishnakanth and K. V. Jeeva in the lead roles. The film was released in 1942.

Plot
It's a mythological story in which events happened some 2000 years ago. A scheming Rajaguru (King's advisor) tries to destroy a respected priest in the kingdom but finally is punished by Gods.

Cast
Adapted from The Hindu article.

M. V. Mani as Vasantha Maharaja
S.D.R. Chandran as Rajaguru Rashtracharya
B. Saraswathi as court dancer Mohini
Krishnakanth as priest Aananthan
K.V. Jeeva as Queen Vasanthi

Soundtrack
Music was scored by K. V. Mahadevan and G. Ramanathan

Reception
The film did fairly well in box-office. Film historian Randor Guy said the film is remembered for "The deft direction by S.D.S.Yogi, good performances by S.D.R. Chandran and B. Saraswathi."

References

Films scored by G. Ramanathan
1940s Tamil-language films
Films scored by K. V. Mahadevan